
In 1939, President Franklin D. Roosevelt moved the Thanksgiving holiday one week earlier than normal, believing that doing so would help bolster retail sales during one of the final years of the Great Depression. This led to much upheaval and protest, causing some to deride the holiday as Franksgiving. The term Franksgiving is a portmanteau of Franklin and Thanksgiving and was coined by Atlantic City mayor Charles D. White in 1939. In 1941, Congress compromised by fixing Thanksgiving on the fourth Thursday of November.

History 
In August 1939, Secretary of Commerce Harry Hopkins was told by a merchant that the late calendar date of Thanksgiving that year (November 30) could possibly have an adverse effect on retail sales. At the time, it was considered bad form for retailers to display Christmas decorations or have "Christmas" sales before the celebration of Thanksgiving, a phenomenon referred to as "Christmas creep".

In keeping with a custom begun by President Abraham Lincoln in 1863, U.S. Presidents had declared a general day of thanksgiving to be observed on the last Thursday in November. By late August of that year, President Roosevelt decided to deviate from this custom and declare November 23, the second-to-last Thursday, as Thanksgiving that year.

The plan encountered immediate opposition. Alf Landon, Roosevelt's Republican challenger in the preceding election, called the declaration "another illustration of the confusion which [Roosevelt's] impulsiveness has caused so frequently during his administration. If the change has any merit at all, more time should have been taken working it out... instead of springing it upon an unprepared country with the omnipotence of a Hitler." While not all critics were political opponents of the president, most parts of New England (then a Republican stronghold relative to the rest of the nation) were among the most vocal areas. James Frasier, the chairman of the selectmen of Plymouth, Massachusetts (the location of the first Thanksgiving holiday) "heartily disapproved".

The short-notice change in dates affected the holiday plans of millions of Americans. For example, many college football teams routinely ended their seasons with rivalry games on Thanksgiving, and had scheduled them that year for the last day in November; some athletic conferences had rules permitting games only through the Saturday following Thanksgiving. If the date were changed, many of these teams would play their games for empty stadiums or not at all. The change also caused problems for college registrars, schedulers, and calendar makers.

A late 1939 Gallup poll indicated that Democrats favored the switch 52% to 48%, while Republicans opposed it 79% to 21%, and that Americans overall opposed the change 62% to 38%.

After announcing August 31, 1939, that he would similarly designate November 21, 1940 (the next year), Roosevelt issued on October 31 his official proclamation calling for "a day of general thanksgiving" on November 23. Such declarations amount to using the "moral authority" of the Presidency, and each state government can independently determine when to cancel work for state (and in some cases, municipal) employees. Twenty-three states' governments and the District of Columbia recognized the non-traditional date, twenty-two states preserved the traditional date on November 30, and the remaining three – Colorado, Mississippi, and Texas – gave holidays in both weeks.

In 1940, 32 states' governments and the District of Columbia observed the earlier date on November 21, while 16 states chose what some were calling the "Republican" Thanksgiving on the 28th.

A 1941 Commerce Department survey found no significant expansion of retail sales due to the change. November of that year once again saw 32 states and the District of Columbia observing the holiday on the 20th, while the remaining 16 states did so on the 27th.

Roughly two in seven last Thursdays of November are the fifth Thursday of that month; in 1939, the fourth (but second to last) Thursday had been named in the presidential proclamation, in lieu of that year's fifth (and last) Thursday.  The second and third of the then non-traditional Thanksgivings remain outliers.  Specifically, the presidential proclamation of November 9, 1940 and November 8, 1941 called for observances on November 21, 1940 and November 20, 1941, respectively, the third (and second to last) Thursdays.  Every such holiday in the 20th century until 1939 had fit into the former tradition, and each year from 1942 on employed the traditional fourth-Thursday celebration.

That new approach was embodied in a joint resolution of Congress, signed into law by President Roosevelt on November 26, 1941, and designating the fourth Thursday in November of each year as Thanksgiving Day. (Prior to that in the 20th century, the phrase "Thanksgiving Day" had been used in the prose of the presidential proclamation only in Calvin Coolidge's first, among his six.) In November 1942, Roosevelt's proclamation made mention of the joint resolution, and of the date it established as Thanksgiving Day, and called for observation "in prayer" of both it and the New Year's Day to follow.

The majority of states immediately changed their laws to coincide with the nationally observed date. The first year following the joint resolution with five Thursdays in November was 1944, and Thanksgiving was observed on the 23rd of the month with the exception of the States of Arkansas, Florida, Georgia, Idaho, Nebraska, Tennessee, Texas, and Virginia. (The nation was in the midst of World War II, and most nationwide celebrations as well as many regional ones were on hiatus at the time. It would not be until after the end of the war, 1945, that the new date of Thanksgiving would fully take root.) Also in 1945, 1950, 1951, and 1956, November had five Thursdays. Texas was the last state to change its law, observing the last-Thursday Thanksgiving for the final time in 1956.

In media 
In a number of popular radio shows of the time, such as those featuring Burns and Allen and Jack Benny, the confusion over when to observe Thanksgiving Day was the source for jokes.

In the 1940 Warner Bros. Merrie Melodies cartoon Holiday Highlights, directed by Tex Avery, the introduction to a segment about Thanksgiving shows the holiday falling on two different dates, one "for Democrats" and one a week later "for Republicans."

The competing dates for Thanksgiving are parodied in the 1942 film Holiday Inn. In the film, a November calendar appears on which an animated turkey jumps back and forth between the two weeks, until he gives up and shrugs his shoulders at the audience.

In the 1940 Three Stooges short film No Census, No Feeling, Curly makes mention of the Fourth of July being in October. When Moe questions him, Curly replies, "You never can tell. Look what they did to Thanksgiving!"

References

External links 

 Letters, postcards, and telegrams received by Roosevelt concerning his decision

Great Depression in the United States
Public holidays in the United States
Thanksgiving (United States)
Presidency of Franklin D. Roosevelt
Political terminology of the United States